Casopitant, former tentative trade names Rezonic (U.S.) and Zunrisa (Europe), is an NK1 receptor antagonist which was undergoing research for the treatment of chemotherapy-induced nausea and vomiting. It was under development by GlaxoSmithKline. In July 2008, the company filed a marketing authorisation application with the European Medicines Agency. The application was withdrawn and development was discontinued in September 2009 because GlaxoSmithKline decided that further safety assessment was necessary. However, a 2022 review listed casopitant as under development as a potential novel antidepressant for the treatment of major depressive disorder, with a phase 2 clinical trial having been completed.

References

Abandoned drugs
Acetamides
Antiemetics
Fluoroarenes
NK1 receptor antagonists
Piperazines
Piperidines
Trifluoromethyl compounds